Erik Kaas (died 20 Sep 1520) was a Roman Catholic prelate who served as Bishop of Viborg (1509–1520).

Biography
On 31 Jan 1509, Erik Kaas was appointed during the papacy of Pope Julius II as Bishop of Viborg. He served as Bishop of Viborg until his death on 20 Sep 1520.

See also 
Catholic Church in Germany

References 

16th-century Roman Catholic bishops in Denmark
Bishops appointed by Pope Julius II
1520 deaths